Sheni may refer to:

Languages 

 Sheni-Ziriya language

Religion 

 Adar Sheni, a month of the Hebrew calendar
 Yom tov sheni shel galuyot, a concept in Jewish practice
 Shenism

Species
Coelorinchus sheni
Enneapterygius sheni
Hemimyzon sheni
Hieromantis sheni
Plectranthias sheni